Mario Dorner (born 21 March 1970) is an Austrian professional footballer who played as a forward for Darlington in the Football League.

References

External links

1970 births
Living people
Sportspeople from Baden bei Wien
Austrian footballers
Association football forwards
FC Admira Wacker Mödling players
LASK players
SKN St. Pölten players
Motherwell F.C. players
Darlington F.C. players
FC Lustenau players
Scottish Football League players
English Football League players
Austrian expatriate footballers
Expatriate footballers in Scotland
Austrian expatriate sportspeople in Scotland
Expatriate footballers in England
Austrian expatriate sportspeople in England
Footballers from Lower Austria